Julius Victor Carstens (29 November 1849, Nusse - 15 November 1908, Pasing) was a German painter. He worked in a variety of genres; including portraits, landscapes and still-lifes. He also painted a few church interiors.

Life and work 
His father, Joachim Hermann Carstens was a doctor. He came from a long line of professionals, established by the jurist,  in the 17th century.

He studied at the Grand-Ducal Saxon Art School, Weimar, with the genre painter Paul Thumann and the history painter Ferdinand Pauwels, after which he made study trips to Belgium and the Netherlands. He always remained aloof from the Secession. Occasionally, he exhibited with the Berliner Kunstausstellung.

He died near Munich. His works are mostly Classical in tone and his still-lifes were generally his most popular works.

Sources 
 Carstens, Julius Victor. In: Ulrich Thieme (Ed.): Allgemeines Lexikon der Bildenden Künstler von der Antike bis zur Gegenwart. Vol.6: Carlini–Cioci. E. A. Seemann, Leipzig 1912 (Online)
 Emmanuel Bénézit: Dictionary of Artists. Band 3: Bülow–Cossin. pg.302 (Online).
 Allgemeines Künstlerlexikon. Die Bildenden Künstler aller Zeiten und Völker. Band 16: Campagne–Cartellier. Saur, München u. a. 1997, S. 629.
 Illustrierter Katalog der Münchner Jahresausstellung von Kunstwerken aller Nationen im Königlichen Glaspalast. Verlag Franz Hanfstängl, 1894.
 Wulf Schadendorf: Museum Behnhaus. Das Haus und seine Räume. Malerei, Skulptur, Kunsthandwerk (Lübecker Museumskataloge 3) Museum für Kunst u. Kulturgeschichte d. Hansestadt, Lübeck 1976, S. 48.

External links 

1849 births
1908 deaths
19th-century German painters
19th-century German male artists
German portrait painters
German still life painters
People from Lauenburg
20th-century German painters
20th-century German male artists